Rory Fleck Byrne (born 1988) is an Irish actor and composer, known for Vampire Academy, Harlots, The Foreigner and This Is Going to Hurt.

Early life
Rory Fleck Byrne was born in England but moved to Ireland when he was nine years old. There he lived in Kilkenny until he moved to London in 2007 to train at the Royal Academy of Dramatic Art, graduating in 2010. He lives in London.

Career
Fleck Byrne's first acting job was in Liverpool in the play Antony and Cleopatra opposite Kim Cattrall. In 2014 Byrne could be seen as Harry Abrams, an assistant of the psychological researcher Joseph Coupland, in the horror movie The Quiet Ones. In 2016 he played Ruby in the movie Tiger Raid. In 2017 he starred as Daniel Marney in eight episodes of Harlots, a drama series about Georgian-era brothels, and the women working there. Fleck Byrne's character Daniel falls in love with the madam of a low-class brothel. Later in 2017 he starred opposite Jackie Chan and Pierce Brosnan in The Foreigner. Fleck Byrne played Brosnan's nephew Sean Morrison, a former British royal navy officer. He later stated that up to then this was one of the best and most challenging experiences he had ever had. He had to train with a stunt team to fight martial arts and get into the mind of a hit-man. As he enjoyed martial arts so much he continued to train it after the film was finished with a personal trainer in London. Fleck Byrne also worked as an actor, writer and producer in the short films Inbox and Bodies. Bodies was set in his hometown Kilkenny. It is about the relationship of two funeral directors who struggle to stay connected to life. Inbox was released with help of the crowdfunding website Kickstarter.

Next to appearing in movies and in TV series, Fleck Byrne also can be seen on stage, in plays including King Charles III (2014–2015), Anna Karenina (2016) and The Phlebotomist (2018).

Personal life
Next to acting Fleck Byrne also enjoys singing. In an interview he mentioned that if he had not become an actor, he would have loved to have been the frontman of a band. He also writes his own songs.

Filmography

Film

Television

Theatre

Other works

References

External links
 

1988 births
Alumni of RADA
English emigrants to Ireland
English people of Irish descent
Irish male actors
Living people
People from Kilkenny (city)